Karanis Site Museum, also known as Kom Aushim Museum, is an archaeological museum located in Fayoum, Faiyum Governorate, Lower Egypt.

The museum displays ancient Egyptian relics from Crocodilopolis and the Faiyum Oasis archaeological region. It covers the history of the Faiyum Governorate, customs and traditions and religious beliefs. The museum has two floors which contain 313 artefacts which date back to pre-history.

See also
Fayum mummy portraits

References

Archaeological museums in Egypt
Egyptological collections in Egypt
Buildings and structures in Faiyum Governorate